Stephen McDonnell may refer to:

 Steven McDonnell (Gaelic footballer) (born 1979), Gaelic football player for Armagh
 Stephen McDonnell (hurler) (born 1989), Irish hurler for Glen Rovers and Cork

See also
 Stephen McDonell, BBC News China correspondent